Catgut suture is a type of surgical suture that is naturally degraded by the body's own proteolytic enzymes. Absorption is complete by 90 days, and full tensile strength remains for at least 7 days. This eventual disintegration makes it good for use in rapidly healing tissues and in internal structures that cannot be re-accessed for suture removal.

Catgut suture has high knot-pull tensile strength and good knot security due to special excellent handling features. It is used for all surgical procedures including general closure, ophthalmic, orthopedics, obstetrics/gynecology and gastrointestinal surgery. It is absorbed faster in patients with cancer, anemia, and malnutrition. It also absorbed faster when used in the mouth and the vagina, due to the presence of microorganisms.

Catgut has largely been replaced by synthetic absorbable polymers such as Vicryl and polydioxanone. It is not used at all for human surgery in some countries. In Europe and Japan, gut sutures have been banned due to concerns that they could transmit bovine spongiform encephalopathy (mad-cow disease), although the herds from which gut is harvested are certified BSE-free.

Manufacture
Catgut suture is made by twisting together strands of purified collagen taken from the serosal or submucosal layer of the small intestine of healthy ruminants (cattle, sheep, goats) or from beef tendon.  The natural plain thread is precision ground in order to achieve a monofilament character and treated with a glycerol-containing solution. The suture is sterilized with a sterilizing fluid containing ethylene oxide, isopropyl alcohol and distilled water. Catgut suture is straw-colored, and is available in sizes USP 6-0 (1 metric) to USP 3 (7 metric).
Although the name implies the usage of guts of cats, there is no record of feline guts being used for this purpose. The word catgut is derived from the term kitgut or kitstring (the string used on a kit, or fiddle). Misinterpretation of the word kit as referring to a young cat led to the use of the term catgut. Surgical gut is in fact made from the submucosa of sheep intestine or the serosa of bovine intestine and is approximately 90% collagen. Perhaps another possible explanation of the name is the combination of the words cattle and gut. B Braun Medical AG, a German Multi National, company first industrialized catgut suture, and Catgut is a brand registered with B Braun.

Variants
Catgut Chrome (B Braun) suture is a variant treated with chromic acid salts. This treatment produces roughly twice the stitch-holding time of plain catgut, but greater tissue inflammation occurs. Full tensile strength is extended to 18–21 days. It is brown rather than straw-colored, and has improved smoothness due to the dry presentation of the thread (plain catgut is wet). It is otherwise similar to plain catgut.

Fast catgut suture is heat-treated to give even more rapid absorption in the body.

History

Al-Zahrawi pioneered many of the procedures and materials still used in operating rooms nowadays. He was the first to use catgut, which is a cord made from intestines of sheep and goat, as the thread for internal stitches. Cauterization was utilized by Al-Zahrawi, usually to treat skin tumors or open abscesses; he applied cauterization procedure to around 50 different operations.

The first known absorbable sutures were made of the intestines of sheep. The manufacturing process was similar to that of natural musical strings for violins and guitar, and also of natural strings for tennis racquets.

Gut strings were being used in surgery as medical sutures as early as the 3rd century AD as Galen, a prominent Greek physician from the Roman Empire, is known to have used them.

References

External links

Stitches (textile arts)
Animal products